Ferdinando Tacca (1619–1686) was an Italian sculptor and architect, active during the Baroque period in Florence.

Biography
He was the son of Pietro Tacca, a sculptor active for the Medici in Florence. After Pietro's death in 1640, Ferdinado inherited his studio and bronze foundry in Borgo Pinti, where he produced both large  equestrian monuments, statuary, and smaller-scale works for both local and foreign patrons.

He helped complete in 1640 the bronze Equestrian Statue of King Philip IV of Spain in Madrid.

He created the Crucifix for the Cathedral of Prato and the Fontana di Bacchino,  located in the city's main piazza. The fountain (1659-1665) depicts young Bacchus in bronze sitting around bunches of grapes.

After 1650, Tacca also became a prominent stage designer and engineer. After 1656, Ferdinando was appointed engineer of the Medici buildings and fortifications.

He designed the Teatro Della Pergola, built in 1656, commissioned by Cardinal Giovanni Carlo de' Medici.

References

1619 births
1686 deaths
Sculptors from Florence
17th-century Italian sculptors
Italian male sculptors
Engineers from Florence